Peter Weidemann (23 March 1940 – 15 June 2012) was an Australian rules footballer who played with Collingwood in the Victorian Football League (VFL).

After leaving Collingwood he played and coached many teams in Tasmania, New South Wales and country Victoria. He is the father of former Adelaide footballer Wayne Weidemann.

Weidemann coached Coolamon Football Club in the South West Football League (New South Wales) in 1964 and 1965, as well as the SWDFL representative side that won the 1964 VCFL Country Championships.

In 1965, Weidemann won the SWDFL best and fairest award, the Gammage Medal.

Notes

External links 
Collingwood Forever profile

		

1940 births
Australian rules footballers from Victoria (Australia)		
Collingwood Football Club players
Dandenong Football Club players
2012 deaths